In February 2009, Heather Strong (March 23, 1982 – February 15, 2009) was kidnapped and murdered in Marion County, Florida. Emilia Lily Carr, a rival for the affections of a man Strong had dated, came under suspicion. Carr denied any guilt and alleged her statements were coerced. Carr was nevertheless found guilty in December 2010 and sentenced to death by lethal injection in February 2011. Carr was one of five women on death row in the state of Florida. On May 19, 2017, Emilia Carr was re-sentenced to life without parole. Joshua Fulgham (Heather Strong's husband, and Carr's co-accused) was similarly convicted of first-degree murder and kidnapping in the death. At a separate trial, where he pled guilty, Joshua Fulgham received two consecutive sentences of life in prison for his involvement in Strong's murder.

Background 
Emilia Lily Carr was born Emilia , on August 4, 1984. She was the second of three sisters. A psychologist estimated her IQ to be 125. At the age of 15, she reported abuse by her father to her school, but withdrew her statement to officials. In February 2004, Carr's father was convicted of attempting to solicit the murders of his family (Emilia, her mother, and one of her sisters) and was sentenced to four years in prison.

Carr had been married twice and filed a restraining order against one of her ex-husbands for domestic violence. She was sentenced to two years of probation for her involvement in her ex-husband's grand theft of exotic birds. Carr had three children at the time, one of them with ex-boyfriend Jamie Acome. At the time of the murder, she was eight months pregnant with a child presumed to be Joshua Fulgham's.

In November 2008, Carr became engaged to Joshua Damien Fulgham, who instead married Heather Strong one month later. However, Carr maintained contact with them and babysat Strong's two children, according to Carr's family. In January 2009, Fulgham was arrested for threatening Strong with a shotgun, but was released after the charge of aggravated assault with a firearm was dropped. Investigators later discovered that Carr had threatened Strong with a knife to force her to withdraw her criminal complaint. Carr and Fulgham re-established their relationship while Strong began seeing someone else. Fulgham and Strong became involved in a legal battle over the custody of their two children.

Murder 

In February 2009, Heather Strong, then a 26-year-old resident of Citra, Florida, disappeared while employed at an Iron Skillet restaurant at a Petro gas station next to Interstate 75 in Reddick. She was reported missing on February 15. Her remains were discovered on March 19, in a shallow grave by a storage trailer in Boardman, near McIntosh, Florida. Carr was arrested on March 24, after investigators noted the frequency of her statements to authorities, ten in all without the presence of an attorney. Detectives also recorded undercover audio of Carr discussing details of the crime with Fulgham's sister. Carr, who at the time was seven months pregnant with Fulgham's child, tricked Strong into the storage trailer behind the home of Carr's mother Maria and placed a plastic bag over her head after unsuccessfully trying to break her neck. Strong eventually died of asphyxiation while bound by duct tape to a computer chair.

Strong's estranged husband Joshua Fulgham was arrested on suspicion of fraud for using her credit cards after she had disappeared. Later in March 2009, Carr gave birth to her fourth child while in custody at Marion County Jail; Her family gained custody of her older three children while her daughter by Fulgham has since been adopted. Carr provided a confession to investigators, but claimed that she had only done so in the hope of being reunited with her children.

Trials of Emilia Carr and Joshua Fulgham 
Emilia Carr and Joshua Fulgham waived their right to a speedy trial during their arraignment for murder in April 2009. Prosecutor Rock Hooker immediately filed notice of his intent to pursue the death penalty because of the heinous nature of the crime. In November 2009, State Circuit Judge Willard Pope declined Emilia Carr's request for a continuance of the trial because of her concerns over the preparedness of defense attorney Candace Hawthorne. A jury found Carr guilty of first-degree murder and kidnapping after two and a half hours of deliberations on December 7, 2010. During the penalty phase of the trial, Carr's family testified on her behalf that she had been traumatized since her early childhood by sexual abuse from her father and grandfather. However, the jury voted 7-to-5 on December 10 in favor of the death penalty for Carr. She was formally sentenced to death by lethal injection on February 22, 2011.

More than a year after Carr's conviction for the murder of Heather Strong, her co-defendant Joshua Fulgham went on trial for his alleged participation in the murder in April 2012. Carr, on death row at the Lowell Correctional Institution Annex, would not testify at the trial. The prosecution detailed the gruesome aspects of the crime. Both the prosecution and Fulgham's defense attorneys agreed that the motives for Heather Strong's murder were jealousy and betrayal. At the conclusion of his trial, Fulgham was convicted of first-degree murder and kidnapping. Despite the death sentence of his co-defendant, Joshua's jury voted 8-to-4 to sentence him to life in prison without a chance of parole and the judge followed the jury's recommendation.

Carr was placed in the annex at Lowell Correctional Institution in Marion County on February 23, 2011. She was one of five women on death row in Florida, the other four being Tiffany Cole, Margaret Allen, Ana Maria Cardona and Tina Brown. Carr also became the first woman to be sentenced to death in Marion County since the 1992 sentencing of Aileen Wuornos. On May 19, 2017, Emilia Carr was re-sentenced to life without parole.

See also 

 Capital punishment in Florida
 Capital punishment in the United States
 List of females executed in the United States
 List of women on death row in the United States
 List of death row inmates in the United States

References 

2009 murders in the United States
Capital murder cases
February 2009 crimes in the United States
Kidnappings in the United States
Deaths by person in Florida
2009 in Florida
Female murder victims
History of women in Florida